Roads (previously known as Berlin Crossroads) is an unincorporated community in Milton Township, Jackson County, Ohio, United States.

History 
The community was settled by people of German descent, and was originally known as "Berlin X Roads".  The Berlin Crossroads Post Office was established on June 28, 1850, and stayed in service under that name until December 30, 1933.  As of 1901, the community was known as "Berlin Cross Roads".  After World War I, due to the local feelings towards Germany, the Berlin part was dropped and in 1962 the community was registered with the USGS as simply "Roads".  At that time, the population was recorded at 130.

References 

Unincorporated communities in Jackson County, Ohio